The Hungary men's national volleyball team is the national team of Hungary. It is governed by the Magyar Röplabda Szövetség and takes part in international volleyball competitions.
Hungary winner two medal in Euro Championship.

Results

Olympic Games

Volleyball at the 1964 Summer Olympics – Men's tournament

Czechoslovakia  	3–2 	Hungary

Hungary  	3–0 	 Japan

Hungary  	3–0 	 United States

 1964 — 6th place
 1968 — did not qualify
 1972 — did not qualify
 1976 — did not qualify
 1980 — did not qualify
 1984 — did not participate
 1988 — did not qualify
 1992 — did not qualify
 1996 — did not qualify
 2000 — did not qualify
 2004 — did not qualify
 2008 — did not qualify
 2012 — did not qualify
 2016 — did not qualify
 2020 — did not qualify

World Championship

 1949 — 7th place
 1952 — 5th place
 1956 — 8th place
 1960 — 6th place
 1962 — 7th place
 1966 — 10th place
 1970 — 11th place
 1974 — did not qualify
 1978 — 14th place
 1982 — did not qualify
 1986 — did not qualify
 1990 — did not qualify
 1994 — did not qualify
 1998 — did not qualify
 2002 — did not qualify
 2006 — did not qualify
 2010 — did not qualify
 2014 — did not qualify
 2018 — did not qualify
 2022 — did not qualify

European Championship

1948 —  did not qualify
1950 —  3rd place
1951 —  did not qualify
1955 —  7th place
1958 —  5th place
1963 —  2nd place
1967 —  6th place
1971 —  5th place
1975 — 11th place
1977 —  4th place
1979 —  8th place
1981 —  did not qualify
1983 — 11th place
1985 —  did not qualify
1987 — did not qualify
1989 — did not qualify
1991 — did not qualify
1993 — did not qualify
1995 — did not qualify
1997 — did not qualify
1999 — did not qualify
2001 — 9th place (tied)
2003 — did not qualify
2005 — did not qualify
2007 — did not qualify
2009 — did not qualify
2011 — did not qualify
2013 — did not qualify
2015 — did not qualify
2017 — did not qualify
2019 — did not qualify
2021 — did not qualify

European Volleyball League
2013 — 12th place
2017 — 6th place
2018 — 19th place
2019 — 17th place (tied)
2021 — 14th place
2022 — 15th place

World League
did not compete

Players

Cséfay Sándor (1946–1947)
Spányik József (1947)
Bizik László (1947)
Abád József (1948)
Machacsek László (1949)
Spányik József (1949)
Bieliczki István (1950)
Abád József (1951)
Prohászka László (1952–1953)
Abád József (1954–1956)
Prohászka László (1957)
Abád József (1957–1962)
Porubszky László (1963–1966)
Prohászka László (1967–1969)
Hennig Ernő (1970–1973)
Juni György (1974)
Tarnawa Ferdinánd (1974–1975)
Garamvölgyi Mátyás (1975–1983)
Róka Gaszton (1984–1985)
Tatár Mihály (1985)
Botos Ferenc (1985–1987)
Sándor Péter (1987–1990)
Botos Ferenc (1990–1991)
Németh Lajos (1992–1995)
Garamvölgyi Mátyás (1996)
Nyári Sándor (1996–2001)
Demeter György (2001–2007)
Kántor Sándor (2008–2011)
Kelemen István (2012)
Demeter György (2013–2016)
Juan Manuel Barrial (2017)
Bogdan Tanase (2018–2019)
Koch Róbert (2020–)

See also
Hungary women's national volleyball team

References

National men's volleyball teams
Volleyball in Hungary
Volleyball
Men's sport in Hungary